The School of Health Sciences at City, University of London, is composed of the former St Bartholomew School of Nursing & Midwifery and School of Allied Health Science.

The School offers undergraduate, postgraduate and research degrees as well as Continuing Personal and Professional Development for those entering or working in health and community-related professions. Disciplines covered include nursing (child, adult and mental health), midwifery, health management, research and policy, speech, language and communication therapy and science diagnostic radiography, therapeutic radiography, ultrasound and optometry.

History
The School was formed in 2008 when the nursing and midwifery college merged with the allied health sciences departments.

The School of Nursing and Midwifery dates its history to the schools of St Bartholomew's Hospital and the Royal London Hospital, the former of which began training in 1867, formalised into a School in 1877. These merged in 1994 to become the St Bartholomew School of Nursing & Midwifery. In 1995 the new school was incorporated into City, University of London. Both schools have produced many nurse leaders and educators.

Campus
The School of Health Sciences is based at City's main campus at Northampton Square.

References

External links 
 

City, University of London
Nursing schools in the United Kingdom